Claudio Cerri (born 9 June 1960) is an Italian former professional racing cyclist. He rode in the 1985 Tour de France.

References

External links
 

1960 births
Living people
Italian male cyclists
Cyclists from the Province of Pavia